David N. Donihue (David Nelson Donihue, b. April 25, 1974) is an American writer, director and actor.  His writing has been mentioned by IndieWire Variety and as a director he is frequently interview by the magazines including 1.4 and Movie Maker Magazine. As a writer/director, his feature films such as Parzania and The Weathered Underground have been internationally distributed his recent mini-movies for Spinnin/Universal, Armada and others are viewed by many. Writer Kelly Hughes wrote in The Huffington Post"Donihue's work is not superficial. It shocks.. It excites... It demands social change"

Early years
Donihue was born in rural Eastern Washington, raised in Auburn, Washington. He started writing plays that were performed for 45 cents in his back yard and local parks when he was as young as seven. His first film was made when he was eleven, utilizing a rented video camera and two borrowed VCR's with stereo cables. His father was a pastor. His mother, Anita Corrine Donihue, was a special education teacher who later became a well known Christian Devotional author.

By his mid teens, Donihue was writing feature length plays. During these years, Donihue began to work graveyard shifts at a local college radio station, KGRG-FM, as an overnight DJ.

There, he became obsessed with experimental music and film, and directed a series of student films. These included Anthony's Apocalypse and Inside Anthony's World.
During this era, at age 18, he wrote Hold My Hand & Tell Me I'm Not Insane, a comedy-drama about a young playwright whose scripts follow his life, yet later dictate it. The play was produced in Seattle with its premiere at the Scottish Rite Hall on Capitol Hill.

During his early twenties, Donihue wrote, directed, acted in and produced several independent plays within the northwest including Hey Baby Do Ya Wanna Come Back To My Place and Justify My Existence, and another pop psychology comedy Brain Aches And The Quest For Redemption Of A Telephone Psychic as well as the forty-minute short film Love Me Tender, Pay Me Well.

In 1999 Donihue began performing under the stage name Punko and released an indie album titled The Day Bob Went Electric.

Professional life
The English language thriller, based on the true story of the Gujarat Riots of 2002, which was initially banned in India, incited protests and bomb threats, and later garnered praise from The New York Times, Variety, and Indiewire.  It was shown in New York as part of the Museum of Modern Arts' India Now film exhibition. Donihue was nominated for Filmfare Awards for Best Screenplay and Best Story for Parzania. The film won the Screen Gem Award for Best Picture.

In 2010, Donihue's four and a half hour interactive choose-your-own adventure film The Weathered Underground was released by Indican starring Heroes Brea Grant. The comic book inspired picture went on to become a small cult classic and is now shown as part of curriculum at many of the world's best film schools. In 2017, Donihue directed another socially driven action comedy, The Bang Brokers.
In 2015 - 2017 Donihue wrote and directed several mini-movies for major brands and dance labels including SOLDIER, DON'T WAIT, GIMME SOME MORE, A LIFETIME AWAY and AGE OF INNOCENCE.

His writing has been commented on by the Los Angeles Times, and as a director he is frequently interview 1.4 and Movie Maker Magazine.

Filmography

Personal life
Donihue lives in Los Angeles, California. He continues to direct a large number of music videos and short form media.

References

American directors
21st-century American dramatists and playwrights
American male screenwriters
American male film actors
American music video directors
Living people
1974 births
American male dramatists and playwrights
21st-century American male writers
21st-century American poets
21st-century American screenwriters